The term Gogo fish may refer to the following fossil fish found in the Gogo Formation in Western Australia:

Gogonasus
Mcnamaraspis kaprios